Spinestoloides is a genus of longhorn beetles of the subfamily Lamiinae.

Species 
Spinestoloides contains the following species:

 Spinestoloides benardi (Breuning, 1980)
 Spinestoloides fasciatus (Martins & Galileo, 2010)
 Spinestoloides hefferni Santos-Silva, Wappes & Galileo, 2018
 Spinestoloides monticola (Fisher, 1942)

References

Desmiphorini
Insects described in 1954